Michael Patrick Moffatt (born March 14, 1977) is a Canadian economist and professor of international trade. He served as director of policy and research at Canada 2020, a progressive Canadian think-tank. He is also an assistant professor at the Richard Ivey School of Business.

Education and career
Moffatt has a combined honours B.A. in economics and political science from the University of Western Ontario and a M.A. economics degree from the University of Rochester. He graduated from the Ph.D. program for business administration at the Richard Ivey School of Business in 2012. He is an assistant professor of business, Economics and Public Policy at Ivey. In 2018, Moffatt was appointed director of policy and research at the progressive think-tank Canada 2020.

He was a "guide" for the Economics topic at About.com and provided weekly articles on economics topics, with a focus towards students. Moffatt is a business and economy consultant and appeared CBC Radio and the National Post. He also is an author for The Globe and Mail.  As of November 15, 2013, Moffatt is a research fellow at the Lawrence National Centre for Policy and Management at Western University's Ivey School of Business.

References

External links
 

Living people
Canadian bloggers
Canadian economists
Canadian people of Scottish descent
Writers from London, Ontario
1977 births
University of Western Ontario alumni
University of Rochester alumni